John Mortimer (1923–2009) was a British writer.

John Mortimer may also refer to:
John B. Mortimer, Hong Kong judge
Jack Cade, leader of the Kent rebellion
John Mortimer (musician), in heavy metal band Holocaust
John Mortimer (MP) for Northamptonshire
John Robert Mortimer (1825–1911), archaeologist
John Mortimer (agriculturalist) (1656–1736), English merchant and writer on agriculture
John Hamilton Mortimer (1740–1779), British painter and printmaker
John Jay Mortimer (1933–2013), American financier

See also
Johnnie Mortimer (1931–1992), British television scriptwriter

John Mortimore (disambiguation)